School of Medicine is one of the two departments of the School of Health Sciences, University of Patras.

The School of Medicine of the University of Patras was founded in 1977 and admitted its first students in October of the same academic year. During the functioning of 28 years, received a degree 2321 students Medicine and dozens another with MSc and PhD.

Staff
The Teaching and Research Staff (TRS) of the department consists of about 150 people (Professors, Associate Professors, Assistant Professors, Lecturers). Members EIB / ACC, administrative staff is 36 people.

Departments
Division of Basic Medical Sciences I
Department of Biochemistry
Department of General Biology
Department of Medical Physics
Division of Basic Medical Sciences II
Department of Anatomy
Department of General Pharmacology
Department of Physiology
Division of Clinical Laboratories
Department of Microbiology
Department of Nuclear Medicine
Department of Pathology
Department of Public Health
Department of Radiology
Division of Internal Medicine Ι
Department of Internal Medicine
Division of Paediatrics & Obstetrics – Gynaecology
Department of Obstetrics - Gynecology
Department of Paediatric Surgery
Department of Paediatrics
Division of Surgery
Department of Anaesthesiology and Intensive Care
Department of Cardiothoracic Surgery
Department of Neurosurgery
Department of Ophthalmology
Department of Orthopaedics
Department of Otorhinolaryngology
Department of Surgery
Department of Urology
Department of Vascular Surgery

Research Infrastructures
Functional Microscopy
Microarray Analysis
RealTime PCR
Phosphorimager
Ultracentrifuge

Establishments

General University Hospital of Patras

Building of preclinical functional
In the preclinical functional building houses the Department of Secretariat, offices of faculty of Basic Medical Sciences and Clinical Laboratories, the Laboratory and Tutorial Rooms and various auxiliary rooms for students, where take place various events.

Library of the School of Medicine
The School of Medicine at the University of Patras have an independent library to be used from the student's community of the School.
The library provides a reading room (150 seats), a copy machine with charge of use and computers. Users may also borrow books from the library as long as they have the library card.

Studies

Undergraduate Studies
School of Medicine offers students the six-year course of study. Organizational has 7 areas:

Basic Medical Sciences I
Basic Medical Sciences II
Clinical Laboratory
Pathology I
Pathology II
Surgical
Pediatrics, Obstetrics, Gynecology

Postgraduate Studies
School of Medicine of University of Patras offers the following postgraduate studies programs:
Postgraduate studies programme "Basic Medical Sciences"
Interuniversity Postgraduate Course in "Biomedical Engineering"
Interdepartmental Postgraduate Course in Medical Physics
Interdepartmental Program of Graduate Studies in "Informatics for Life Sciences"
Postgraduate Course in “Public Health”

External links
School of Medicine University of Patras website

University of Patras